John Gordon Morrison  (29 January 1904 – 11 May 1998) was a British-born Australian novelist and short story writer.

Life
John Morrison was born in Sunderland, England on 29 January 1904. His interest in flora and the natural world saw him begin work at the Sunderland Museum and Winter Gardens at the age of 14. After two and a half years there he went to work as a learner-gardener for a wealthy shipowner at East Boldon

His first wife was Frances Jones (?-1967). They had two children: John, and Marie. He married his second wife, Rachel Gordon (?-1997), in 1969.

Australia
He migrated to Australia in 1923 and initially worked on sheep-stations in New South Wales.
His first Australian job was in the garden of historic Zara Station at Wanganella, outback of Deniliquin. The wide open spaces gave him a sense of freedom: warm friendship with his mates imbued him with the confidence to explore the Australian working class milieu in his stories, and he determined to live out his life in this place of "glamor and independence".Family pressure took him back to England in 1927 — there was a crippled brother suffering from infantile paralysis — but the brief visit was disastrous due to his intense homesickness for Australia. From this unhappy time comes one of his best short stories, The Incense Burner. An Aussie digger exiled to a shabby London rooming house lives and dies with no comfort other than the scent of smouldering eucalyptus leaves.

On his return to Australia, he and Frances settled in Melbourne in 1928, where he began a ten-year stint working on the Melbourne waterfront and, later, as a gardner. He subsequently joined the Communist Party of Australia. He worked as a gardener at Caulfield Grammar School from 1950 to 1963.

Writer
He published his first stories under the name of "Gordon", and later as "John Morrison", in trade union publications during this time. He was later a member of the Realist Writers Group and went on to publish a number of short stories in newspapers,  two novels, four collections of stories and a book of essays.

After leaving the waterfront he worked as a jobbing gardener based in Mentone. He later worked as a gardner at Caulfield Grammar School until 1963, when he became a full-time writer; publishing also book reviews and journalism.

Morrison, “likened the writer to the man who comes across an interesting rock or stone and puts it in his pocket. For months, perhaps years, he carries it about, rolling it in his hands from time to time until it is polished. His stories, he said, were like these stones.”

His literary friends and associates included John Behan, Alan Marshall, Frank Dalby Davison, Frank Hardy and Judah Waten. He was a member of the Realist Writers Group.

Awards
He won a number of short story competitions.

He was awarded a Commonwealth Literary Fund grant in both 1948 and 1949, the Gold Medal of the Australian Literature Society in 1963, and the Patrick White Literary Award in 1986. He was made a Member of the Order of Australia in the 1989 Queens Birthday Honours List.

Bibliography

Novels
 The Creeping City (1949) 
 Port of Call (1950)

Short fiction 
Collections
 Sailors Belong Ships (1947) 
 Black Cargo (1955) 
 Twenty-Three : Stories (1962)
 John Morrison, Selected Stories (1972)
 North Wind (1982) 
 Stories of the Waterfront (1984) 
 This Freedom (1985)
 The Best Stories of John Morrison (1988)
Stories

Non-fiction
Books
 Australian by Choice (essays, 1973) 
 The Happy Warrior (memoirs, 1987)
Journalism
 "That'll be the bloody day!", The (Sydney) Tribune, (Tuesday, 10 July 1973), p.7.

Death
He died in Melbourne on 11 May 1998.

Legacy
In 1974, the Victorian branch of the Fellowship of Australian Writers instituted The John Morrison Short Story Award, "an award for a story of up to 3000 words on any theme".

See also
 List of Caulfield Grammar School people

References

Further reading
 A Wharfie Slung Ink As Well, Fact: The Up-to-the-Minute Australian News-Review: Supplement to The (Sydney) Sunday Sun, (Sunday 15 April 1945), p.4.
 Callander, Ron, https://www.austlit.edu.au/austlit/page/8470105 AM.", Overland, Vol.79, No,3, (Winter 1999), pp.78-91.
 Davidson, Jim, "Stephen’s Vector", Overland, no.216, (Spring 2014), pp.91-97.
 Galimond, Paul, "John Morrison: Writer of Proletarian Life", Sydney Review of Books, 11 August 2015.
 Gill, Rae, Approach to the Text: Stories of the Waterfront by John Morrison, NSW Dept. of School Education, Learning Materials Production Centre, (Ryde), 1983.
 Lowenstein, Wendy & Hills, Tom, Under the Hook: Melbourne Waterside Workers Remember Working Lives and Class War, 1900-1980 (New Edition), Bookworkers Press in association with Working Titles, (Prahran), 1998.
 McLaren, John, "Bias Australian?", Overland, no.217, (Summer 2014), pp.86-93. 
 McLaren, John, "John Morrison: Memories, Reminiscences and Some Judgements", Southerly, Vol.61, No.3, (2001-2002), pp. 15–22. 
 McLaren, John, "The British Tradition in John Morrison’s Radical Nationalism", Australian Literary Studies, Vol.20, No.3, (1 May 2002), pp. 215–234.
 Phillips, A.A., "The Short Stories of John Morrison", Overland, Vol.58, (Winter 1974), pp. 31–35.
 Rumsey, Jennifer Isabella, John Gordon Morrison: A Biography, Ph.D. Dissertation, Department of English, Faculty of Arts, University of Sydney, 2004. (Catalogue entry:  .)
 John Gordon Morrison (1904-1998), The University of Melbourne Archives.

Portraits
 Kahan, Louis (not dated), felt tip pen portrait of John Morrison, University of Melbourne Library Print Collection.
 John Gordon Morrison, Wharf Labourer and Author; Recipient of the Patrick White Literary Award, 1986 and the Order of Australia, 1989, Australian National University Library Collection.
 Bolton, A.T.,  Portrait of John Morrison, Ripponlea, 1986, National Library of Australia.

1904 births
1998 deaths
20th-century Australian male writers
20th-century Australian novelists
20th-century Australian short story writers
ALS Gold Medal winners
Australian gardeners
Australian male novelists
Australian male short story writers
Australian waterside workers
Meanjin people
Members of the Order of Australia
People from Sunderland
Writers from Tyne and Wear
British emigrants to Australia